The 2020 season was Persib's 87th season since its foundation, 24th consecutive season in the top-flight of Indonesian football, and 12th season competing in Liga 1.

Review

Pre-season 
Persib began its transfer dealings with the return of veteran defender Victor Igbonefo after spending one season with PTT Rayong in Thailand.

On 10 January, Persib signed young striker Beni Oktovianto from Persiba Balikpapan. Six days later, the club acquired the services of goalkeeper Teja Paku Alam from Semen Padang.

On 18 January took part in the Asia Challenge Cup pre-season tournament, starting with 3–0 defeat to Selangor. The next day, they were leading 2–0 over Hanoi at half time before the match was abandoned due to heavy rain.

On 21 January, last season's top scorer, Ezechiel N'Douassel left the club to join Bhayangkara for an undisclosed fee, with a clause in his contract prohibiting him to play against Persib.

On 4 February, Persib announced the return of winger Zulham Zamrun having spent three seasons away from the club.

On 10 February, Persib completed the signings of two foreign strikers, Wander Luiz and Geoffrey Castillion.

On 26 February, Umuh Muchtar resigned from his position as Persib team manager but will remain in the ranks of the club's management structure.

March 
Persib started the season with a 3–0 win over Persela, courtesy of two goals from Wander Luiz and one from Geoffrey Castillion, in the opening day of Liga 1. Wander Luiz would score again in the next match against Arema, scoring from the spot as Persib won 2–1. Maung Bandung kept the momentum going with a 2–1 win over PSS. Wander Luiz and Castillion were once again on the scoresheet as Persib were on top of the league before it was suspended due to the COVID-19 pandemic.

Coaching staff 

Source:Persib.co.id

Players

Team information

Transfers

In

Out

On loan

Pre-season and friendlies

Asia Challenge Cup

Friendlies

Competitions

Overview

Liga 1

Standings

Results summary

Results by matchday

Matches

Squad statistics

Appearances and goals

Goalscorers

Assists

Goalkeeping statistics 

 Notes:
CS – Clean Sheet
GA – Goals Against

Disciplinary record

References

External links 
  
 Unofficial website 
 Persib Bandung on FIFA
 Persib Bandung on Liga Indonesia

Persib Bandung